Jiří Wolker (29 March 1900 – 3 January 1924) was a Czech poet, journalist and playwright. He was one of the founding members of KSČ - Communist Party of Czechoslovakia - in 1921.

Life 
He was born in Prostějov, into a cultural family. He studied at the Prostějov gymnasium, and after he graduated, he moved to Prague. He studied law there, but simultaneously attended lectures of Zdeněk Nejedlý and F. X. Šalda at the Faculty of Arts. He was in close connection with the association of Czech avant-garde artists Devětsil. Wolker suffered of lung disease and died of tuberculosis at age 23.

Work 

 Host do domu (1921) - poetry
 Proletářské umění (1922)
 Těžká hodina (1922) - poetry, the book jacket of the first edition was created by the Czech painter Josef Čapek.
 Tři hry (1923) - plays, rather marginal meaning
 Do boje, lásko, leť

References 

 Bohuš Balajka: Přehledné dějiny literatury II. Prague: Fortuna, 2005.

External links 

Czech male poets
Czech male dramatists and playwrights
Czech journalists
Writers from Prostějov
Czech people of German descent
1900 births
1924 deaths
Communist Party of Czechoslovakia politicians
20th-century Czech poets
20th-century Czech dramatists and playwrights
Communist poets
20th-century journalists
20th-century deaths from tuberculosis
Tuberculosis deaths in Czechoslovakia
Tuberculosis deaths in the Czech Republic